A by-election was held for the New South Wales Legislative Assembly electorate of Vaucluse on 6 June 1988 because of the death of Ray Aston.

Dates

Results

Ray Aston died.

See also
Electoral results for the district of Vaucluse
List of New South Wales state by-elections

References

1988 elections in Australia
New South Wales state by-elections
1980s in New South Wales